A total of 39 UEFA teams entered qualification for the 1994 FIFA World Cup. However, Liechtenstein withdrew before the draw was made. The CIS, then Russia took the Soviet Union's spot after the Soviet Union dissolved while FIFA suspended Yugoslavia due to United Nations sanctions stemming from the Yugoslav wars. The European zone was allocated 13 from 24 places in the final tournament. Germany, the defending champions, qualified automatically, leaving 12 spots open for competition between 37 teams.

The 37 teams were divided into six groups, five of six teams each and one of seven teams (though Group 5 ended up with just five teams following Yugoslavia's suspension). The teams would play against each other on a home-and-away basis with the group winners and runners-up qualifying for the final tournament.

San Marino and Faroe Islands competed in World Cup qualifiers for the first time, and Israel moved to UEFA after competing in Oceanian zone for 1986 and 1990 qualification. while Estonia, Lithuania and Latvia competed separately after playing as a part of the Soviet Union from 1958 to 1990.

Seedings
The draw was made on 8 December 1991. The national teams which eventually qualified for the final tournament are presented in bold.

Summary

Groups

Group 1

Group 2

Group 3

Group 4

Group 5

Group 6

Qualified teams
The following 13 teams from UEFA qualified for the final tournament.

1 Bold indicates champions for that year. Italic indicates hosts for that year.
2 Competed as West Germany. A separate team for East Germany also participated in qualifications during this time, having only competed in 1974.
3 Competed as Soviet Union.

Goalscorers

9 goals

 Florin Răducioiu

8 goals

 Ian Rush

7 goals

 David Platt
 Julio Salinas
 Martin Dahlin

6 goals

 Peter Dubovský
 Eric Cantona
 John Aldridge
 Peter van Vossen
 Stéphane Chapuisat

5 goals

 Andreas Herzog
 Marc Wilmots
 Hristo Stoichkov
 Ian Wright
 Roberto Baggio
 Dennis Bergkamp
 Kjetil Rekdal
 Gheorghe Hagi
 Adrian Knup

4 goals

 Enzo Scifo
 Emil Kostadinov
 Andreas Sotiriou
 Frank Pingel
 Paul Gascoigne
 Jean-Pierre Papin
 Ilie Dumitrescu
 Gavril Balint
 Sergei Kiriakov
 Georges Bregy
 Dean Saunders

3 goals

 Lyuboslav Penev
 Pavel Kuka
 Kim Vilfort
 Les Ferdinand
 Laurent Blanc
 Kálmán Kovács
 Steve Staunton
 Ronen Harazi
 Dino Baggio
 Roberto Mancini
 Giuseppe Signori
 Ainārs Linards
 John Bosman
 Ronald de Boer
 Kevin Wilson
 Jostein Flo
 Gunnar Halle
 Gøran Sørloth
 Marek Leśniak
 Jorge Cadete
 Ioan Lupescu
 Sergei Yuran
 Ally McCoist
 Pat Nevin
 Txiki Begiristain
 Fernando Hierro
 Tomas Brolin
 Christophe Ohrel
 Feyyaz Uçar
 Hakan Şükür

2 goals

 Sokol Kushta
 Dietmar Kühbauer
 Heimo Pfeifenberger
 Anton Polster
 Philippe Albert
 Krasimir Balakov
 Nasko Sirakov
 Radoslav Látal
 Václav Němeček
 Marek Poštulka
 Brian Laudrup
 Paul Ince
 Stuart Pearce
 Ari Hjelm
 Aki Hyryläinen
 Franck Sauzée
 Stratos Apostolakis
 Nikos Machlas
 Tasos Mitropoulos
 Lajos Détári
 Arnór Guðjohnsen
 Eyjólfur Sverrisson
 Paul McGrath
 Niall Quinn
 Ronny Rosenthal
 Itzik Zohar
 Pierluigi Casiraghi
 Stefano Eranio
 Robertas Fridrikas
 John de Wolf
 Wim Jonk
 Ronald Koeman
 Rob Witschge
 Jim Magilton
 Jimmy Quinn
 Gerry Taggart
 Lars Bohinen
 Jan Åge Fjørtoft
 Mini Jakobsen
 Roger Nilsen
 Wojciech Kowalczyk
 Rui Águas
 Rui Barros
 Rui Costa
 Paulo Futre
 João Domingos Pinto
 John Collins
 Kevin Gallacher
 José Mari Bakero
 José Luis Caminero
 Julen Guerrero
 Míchel
 Klas Ingesson
 Ciriaco Sforza
 Ertuğrul Sağlam
 Ryan Giggs
 Mark Hughes

1 goal

 Edmond Abazi
 Sulejman Demollari
 Ilir Kepa
 Altin Rraklli
 Andreas Ogris
 Hannes Reinmayr
 Peter Stöger
 Michael Zisser
 Alexandre Czerniatynski
 Marc Degryse
 Rudi Smidts
 Lorenzo Staelens
 Trifon Ivanov
 Yordan Letchkov
 Zlatko Yankov
 Yiannos Ioannou
 Nikos Papavasiliou
 Pambos Pittas
 Panayiotis Xiourouppas
 Pavel Hapal
 Ivan Hašek
 Miroslav Kadlec
 Ľubomír Moravčík
 Tomáš Skuhravý
 Petr Vrabec
 John Jensen
 Henrik Larsen
 Peter Møller
 Lars Olsen
 Flemming Povlsen
 Mark Strudal
 John Barnes
 Carlton Palmer
 Alan Shearer
 Sergei Bragin
 Uni Arge
 Petri Järvinen
 Jari Litmanen
 Mika-Matti Paatelainen
 Marko Rajamäki
 Kim Suominen
 David Ginola
 Alain Roche
 Vasilis Dimitriadis
 Dimitris Saravakos
 Panagiotis Sofianopoulos
 Panagiotis Tsalouchidis
 László Klausz
 Haraldur Ingólfsson
 Hörður Magnússon
 Þorvaldur Örlygsson
 Tony Cascarino
 Alan Kernaghan
 Alan McLoughlin
 Kevin Sheedy
 John Sheridan
 Andy Townsend
 Reuven Atar
 Tal Banin
 Eyal Berkovic
 Roberto Donadoni
 Paolo Maldini
 Gianluca Vialli
 Pietro Vierchowod
 Oļegs Aleksejenko
 Virginijus Baltušnikas
 Stasys Baranauskas
 Arminas Narbekovas
 Eimantas Poderis
 Viačeslavas Sukristovas
 Andrėjus Tereškinas
 Stefano Fanelli
 Carmel Busuttil
 Martin Gregory
 Kristian Laferla
 Ruud Gullit
 Marc Overmars
 John van den Brom
 Colin Clarke
 Mal Donaghy
 Iain Dowie
 Phil Gray
 Alan McDonald
 Ronny Johnsen
 Oyvind Leonhardsen
 Erik Mykland
 Dariusz Adamczuk
 Marek Koźmiński
 Jan Furtok
 Tomasz Wałdoch
 Krzysztof Warzycha
 Fernando Couto
 Oceano da Cruz
 António Folha
 António Nogueira
 José Orlando Semedo
 Ovidiu Hanganu
 Marius Lǎcǎtuş
 Constantin Pană
 Gheorghe Popescu
 Aleksandr Borodiuk
 Igor Dobrovolski
 Andrei Kanchelskis
 Igor Kolyvanov
 Vasili Kulkov
 Andrei Piatnitski
 Dmitri Radchenko
 Igor Shalimov
 Davide Gualtieri
 Nicola Bacciocchi
 Scott Booth
 Colin Hendry
 Brian McClair
 Billy McKinlay
 Adolfo Aldana
 Thomas Christiansen
 Pep Guardiola
 Cristóbal Parralo
 Alfonso Pérez
 Toni
 Jan Eriksson
 Stefan Landberg
 Henrik Larsson
 Anders Limpar
 Håkan Mild
 Stefan Pettersson
 Pär Zetterberg
 Thomas Bickel
 Marc Hottiger
 Kubilay Türkyilmaz
 Bülent Korkmaz
 Hami Mandıralı
 Orhan Çıkırıkçı
 Clayton Blackmore
 Mark Bowen
 Eric Young

1 own goal

 Jozef Chovanec (playing against Belgium)
 Hlynur Birgisson (playing against Luxembourg)
 Nicola Bacciocchi (playing against the Netherlands)

See also
1994 FIFA World Cup qualification (AFC)
1994 FIFA World Cup qualification (CAF)
1994 FIFA World Cup qualification (CONCACAF)
1994 FIFA World Cup qualification (CONMEBOL)
1994 FIFA World Cup qualification (OFC)

Notes
To date, this was the last time that England and France failed to qualify for a FIFA World Cup.

References

External links
Detailed Match Results at RSSSF
Complete Results at FIFA.com
The forgotten story of 17 November 1993, Rob Smyth, The Guardian – article about the last qualifying matches for World Cup 1994

 
UEFA
FIFA World Cup qualification (UEFA)
World Cup
World Cup